Shalini Randeria is an American-born Indian anthropologist, tenured as a professor of anthropology and sociology at the Graduate Institute of International and Development Studies (IHEID) in Geneva, Switzerland and appointed as the rector of the Institut für die Wissenschaften vom Menschen (IWM) in Vienna, Austria. She is also the director of the Albert Hirschman Centre on Democracy, a research centre affiliated to the Graduate Institute.

Considered as an expert on democracies, she has held various positions at the University of Zurich, the University of Munich, the Central European University (Budapest), and retains the position of visiting professor at the WZB Berlin Social Science Center. She was formerly a member of the editorial board of the Annual Review of Anthropology.

In June 2021, the Central European University announced that Randeria would become the university's sixth president and rector. Randeria succeeded Michael Ignatieff and became the first woman to serve as president of the university.  

Born in Washington, D.C., and brought up in Mumbai and New Delhi, Randeria is an alumna of the University of Delhi, the University of Oxford and Heidelberg University, and earned her PhD at the Free University of Berlin.

References

Living people
Indian anthropologists
Indian women anthropologists
Indian academics
Indian women academics
Indian women social scientists
Academic staff of the Graduate Institute of International and Development Studies
Delhi University alumni
Alumni of the University of Oxford
Heidelberg University alumni
Free University of Berlin alumni
Year of birth missing (living people)
Academic staff of Central European University
Academic staff of the University of Zurich